Anson Williams (born Anson William Heimlich; September 25, 1949) is an American actor, singer, and director, best known for his role as gullible, well-intentioned singer Warren "Potsie" Weber on the television series Happy Days (1974–1984), a role for which he was nominated for the Golden Globe Award for Best Supporting Actor – Series, Miniseries or Television Film.

Williams has since become a prominent television director, working on programs such as Melrose Place (1992–1999), Beverly Hills, 90210 (1990–2000), Sabrina the Teenage Witch (1996–2003), Lizzie McGuire (2001–2004), and The Secret Life of the American Teenager (2008–2013).

Life and career
Williams was born Anson William Heimlich to a Jewish family. His father, Haskell Heimlich, legally changed the spelling of the family name to "Heimlick", unlike Williams's uncle, Dr. Henry Heimlich, namesake of the Heimlich maneuver for treating choking victims. Williams attended Burbank High School, where he was captain of the track team and acted in multiple school productions.  In 1971, he appeared with John Amos in a commercial for McDonald's.

In 1972, Williams portrayed Potsie Weber in a segment of the comedy-anthology series Love, American Style titled "Love and the Happy Days", which also introduced Richie Cunningham (Ron Howard), Richie's mother Marion (Marion Ross), and other characters who were spun off into the television series Happy Days. (Only Williams, Howard, and Ross reprised their roles). The new series' first season, during which Williams received second billing after Howard, was centered mainly on Richie and Potsie. Eventually, as breakout character Arthur "Fonzie" Fonzarelli (Henry Winkler) and Richie's mother, father, and sister became more popular, Potsie was joined by Ralph Malph (Don Most, who was merely a side character in season one), and Potsie and Ralph became inseparable.

Unlike Howard and Most, Williams was one of the few to remain through the entire run of the series, although his appearances became less frequent in later seasons. In some episodes, Richie, Potsie, and Ralph formed a band combo that performed at Arnold's Drive-In and other places. As Potsie, Williams actually sang lead vocals for the group. Williams's first wife, Lorrie Mahaffey, portrayed Potsie's girlfriend, Jennifer, in later seasons.

In 1977, during his run on "Happy Days" Williams recorded and released a single, "Deeply" which peaked at #93 on the Hot 100.

After Happy Days, Williams began a much more prolific career as a television director, starting with short programs for adolescent-age children, including afterschool specials "No Greater Gift" (1985) and "The Drug Knot" (1986), and TV-movie Lone Star Kid (1986). He has gone on to direct many episodes for a variety of television series, including The Pretender, Beverly Hills, 90210, Melrose Place, seaQuest 2032, Star Trek: Deep Space Nine, Star Trek: Voyager, Xena: Warrior Princess, Hercules: The Legendary Journeys, The Secret Life of the American Teenager, Sabrina the Teenage Witch and Charmed. He also directed several episodes of the TV series 7th Heaven.

Despite his success as a director and producer, Williams has occasionally returned to his work on Happy Days in retrospective ways. He played himself in a 1996 Happy Days-themed Boy Meets World episode (which also featured former castmates Tom Bosley and Pat Morita).  While directing a 2003 episode of Sabrina the Teenage Witch titled "Sabrina in Wonderland", he appeared as Potsie in a fantasy sequence. He also joined his fellow Happy Days cast members for two reunion specials: The Happy Days Reunion Special (1992) and Happy Days: 30th Anniversary Reunion (2005).
Williams initially objected to footage of Potsie appearing in Weezer's 1994 music video Buddy Holly, which was set in Arnold's Drive-In from Happy Days, but he later relented.

Williams is also a businessman. In 1987, fellow Happy Days cast member Al Molinaro and he opened a chain of diners called Big Al's; however the business lasted only a short time. He founded Starmaker Products, a cosmetics company, and was a featured speaker at the U.S. Patent and Trademark Office's National Trademark Expo in April 2008, at which he talked about the importance of registered trademarks for small businesses (and signed autographs for Happy Days fans). Williams is the author of Singing to a Bulldog: From Happy Days to Hollywood Director, and the Unlikely Mentor Who Got Me There.

Happy Days lawsuit
On April 19, 2011, Williams and four of his Happy Days co-stars, Erin Moran, Don Most, Marion Ross and the estate of Tom Bosley, who died in 2010, filed a $10 million breach-of-contract lawsuit against CBS, which owns the show, claiming they had not been paid for merchandising revenues owed under their contracts. The cast members claimed they had not received revenues from show-related items, including comic books, T-shirts, scrapbooks, trading cards, games, lunch boxes, dolls, toy cars, magnets, greeting cards, and DVDs, where their images appear on the box covers. Under their contracts, they were supposed to be paid 5% from the net proceeds of merchandising if their sole images were used, and half that amount if they were in a group. CBS said it owed the actors $8,500 and $9,000 each, most of it from slot machine revenues, but the group said they were owed millions. The lawsuit was initiated after Ross was informed by a friend playing slots at a casino of a "Happy Days" machine on which players win the jackpot when five Marion Rosses are rolled.

In October 2011, a judge rejected the group's fraud claim, which meant they could not receive millions of dollars in potential damages. On June 5, 2012, a judge denied a motion filed by CBS to have the case thrown out, which meant it would go to trial on July 17 if the parties did not reach a settlement by then. In July 2012, the actors settled their lawsuit with CBS. Each received a payment of $65,000 and a promise by CBS to continue honoring the terms of their contracts. Williams said, "I'm very satisfied with the settlement. And that's all I can say."

Mayoral Candidate - Ojai California 

On July 7, 2022, Williams announced that he would be running for the position of Mayor of Ojai, California. He lost to incumbent mayor Betsey Stix by 42 votes, with Williams receiving 1,781 votes to Stix’s 1823.

Filmography

Actor

Director

References

External links

Interview with Anson Williams, Accessed August 12, 2017.

1949 births
Living people
Male actors from Los Angeles
American male television actors
American television directors
Television producers from California
20th-century American male actors
21st-century American male actors
People from Los Angeles
Jewish American male actors
Male actors from Burbank, California
21st-century American Jews